The Providence Friars represents Providence College in Women's Hockey East Association play during the 2016–17 NCAA Division I women's ice hockey season.

Offseason
September 24: Christina Putigna wasselected to Team Canada U-22 to participate in a 3-game series against Team USA in Calgary.  Head Coach Bob Deraney served as the Team USA Head Coach in the same series.

Recruiting

Roster

2016–17 Friars

Schedule

|-
!colspan=12 style=""| Regular Season

|-
!colspan=12 style=""| WHEA Tournament

Awards and honors

Coach Bob Deraney claimed his 300th career win at Maine on January 29.

References

Providence
Providence Friars women's ice hockey